Abrahamsenbreen is a glacier in Andrée Land at Spitsbergen, Svalbard. It has a length of fourteen kilometers, and is located in the inner part of Woodfjorddalen, branching off from Holtedahlfonna. The glacier is named after polar explorer Edvard Abrahamsen.

References

Glaciers of Spitsbergen